Mark Steven Brouhard (born May 22, 1956) is an American former professional baseball outfielder. He played in Major League Baseball (MLB) for six seasons, from 1980 until 1985, for the Milwaukee Brewers. In 1986 and 1987, he played in the Nippon Professional Baseball for the Yakult Swallows.

Brouhard retired from baseball and owns a painting business in Camarillo, California.

External links

1956 births
Living people
American expatriate baseball players in Canada
American expatriate baseball players in Japan
Baseball players from California
Edmonton Trappers players
El Paso Diablos players
Idaho Falls Angels players
LAPC Brahma Bulls baseball players
Major League Baseball outfielders
Midland Angels players
Milwaukee Brewers players
Salinas Angels players
Sportspeople from Burbank, California
Vancouver Canadians players
Yakult Swallows players